Loxostege peltaloides is a moth in the family Crambidae. It was described by Rebel in Wagner in 1932. It is found in Turkey.

References

Moths described in 1932
Pyraustinae